Oakdale High School is a high school located in the Oakdale Joint Unified School District in Oakdale, California, United States. The mascot is the Mustang. The school serves students in grades nine through twelve.

Athletics
Oakdale High School offers water polo, swimming, track, wrestling, rodeo, golf, tennis, volleyball, cross country, football, baseball, softball, basketball, cheerleading, wrestling and women's basketball.

Notable alumni
 Oscar Zeta Acosta - lawyer, Chicano activist, and author
 Bruce Coslet -  former NFL football player and professional football coach; played for the Cincinnati Bengals
 Eddie LeBaron - NFL football player for the Washington Redskins and Dallas Cowboys; four-time Pro Bowl player; College Football Hall of Famer

Joe Rudy

Seth Burford - NFL football player for the San Diego Chargers.

References

External links
 Oakdale High School
 School district site

Schools in Oakdale, California
Educational institutions established in 1891
High schools in Stanislaus County, California
Public high schools in California
1891 establishments in California